Zarneh District is a district (bakhsh) in Eyvan County, Ilam Province, Iran. At the 2006 census, its population was 9,522, in 1,959 families.  The District has one city: Zarneh. The District has two rural districts (dehestan): Kalan Rural District and Zarneh Rural District.

See also
Taq e Shirin and Farhad

References 

Districts of Ilam Province
Eyvan County